Da Drought 3 is the sixth mixtape by Lil Wayne, released on April 13, 2007.

Background 
This is the third in the trilogy of mixtapes in Da Drought series. Released in 2007, the mixtape was delayed slightly as a result of Wayne's last-minute decision to add songs to the album's second disc. The album is available as a free legal download. It only contains remixes of other songs. It is noted for Lil Wayne's use of similes, liquid non sequiturs, and metaphors.

When speaking to MTV about the double mixtape, Lil Wayne stated that he did not plan on two discs being released until he found how many songs he had recorded. He also stated he did not have a preconceived plan on how to choose the songs:

Reception 

Da Drought 3 received acclaim from critics and was hailed as the best mixtape of 2007 by MTV News. Lil Wayne was officially named the "Hottest MC" by their hip hop brain trust. It was also nominated for mixtape of the year at the Ozone Awards but lost to Killer Mike's I Pledge Allegiance to the Grind. The album was #27 on Rolling Stone'''s list of the Top 50 Albums of 2007. Online music magazine Pitchfork Media placed Da Drought 3'' at number 99 on their list of the Top 200 albums of the 2000s and in 2016 they listed it number one on their list of the 50 Best Rap Mixtapes of the Millennium.

Track listing

Disc one

Disc two

References 

Lil Wayne albums
2007 mixtape albums
Cash Money Records compilation albums
Sequel albums